Samuel D. Sturgis Jr. (August 1, 1861 – March 7, 1933) was a senior officer of the United States Army who commanded the 87th and 80th divisions during World War I.

Early life and career
Samuel Davis Sturgis Jr. was born in St. Louis, Missouri on August 1, 1861, the son of Samuel D. Sturgis and Jerusha (Wilcox) Sturgis. He attended Washington University in St. Louis before becoming a student at the United States Military Academy. Sturgis graduated 13th of 37 in the class of 1884, and was commissioned as a second lieutenant of Field Artillery.

Sturgis was assigned to the 1st Field Artillery, with which he served until 1891. His initial assignments included postings to Alcatraz Island, the Presidio of San Francisco, and the harbor defenses of San Diego, San Pedro, and Santa Barbara, and Fort Mason, California.

After assignment to West Point from 1890 to 1891, Sturgis served until as aide-de-camp to Wesley Merritt during Merritt's command of the Department of Dakota and Department of the Missouri. He then served with his regiment at Fort Riley, and then transferred to the 6th Artillery, with which he served at Fort Monroe and Fort McHenry. In 1897 and 1898, Sturgis was assistant adjutant of the Department of the Pacific.

War with Spain
During the War with Spain, Sturgis was assigned as assistant adjutant of the Eighth Corps. He took part in the Battle of Manila, and then served as adjutant of the Department of Dakota. He was subsequently assigned to Cuba, and served as disbursing officer of Cuban funds for the Department of Havana and assistant adjutant of the Department of Pinar del Rio.

Philippine Insurrection
Sturgis took part in the Philippine Insurrection, and served as assistant adjutant of the Philippine Division. He also served as adjutant of an expedition commanded by Theodore Schwan.

Interwar period
From 1901 to 1906, Sturgis was assigned to command the 12th Battery of Field Artillery, and served at Fort Douglas and Fort D. A. Russell. During 1906 he also served as adjutant of the 2nd Provisional Field Artillery, an experimental organization that conducted operations at Fort Sill. From 1907 to 1909, Sturgis served on the Army staff at the War Department.  He was chief of staff of the Department of Dakota from 1909 to 1911.

In March 1911, Sturgis was promoted to lieutenant colonel and assigned as second in command of the 3d Field Artillery, based at Fort Sam Houston. He was assigned as the regimental commander in May, and served until August. Between November 1911 and December 1912, Sturgis was a student at the Field Artillery School of Fire, and then the Mounted Service School at Fort Riley. He was promoted to colonel in December 1912.

In May 1913, Sturgis was assigned to command the 1st Field Artillery at Schofield Barracks, and he remained until January 1916, when he was ordered to Fort Sam Houston to organize and command the 7th Field Artillery. In May 1917, Sturgis was promoted to brigadier general, and in July 1917, he was assigned to command the training camp organized at Camp Leon Springs in anticipation of U.S. entry into World War I.

World War I

In August 1917, Sturgis was promoted to temporary major general and assigned to command Camp Pike, Arkansas and the 87th Division. After leading it though its organization and training, Sturgis led the division in France beginning in August 1918, when it was used to provide replacement troops for front line units. He remained in command until the end of the war in November. From November 1918 until April 1919, Sturgis commanded the 80th Division during its post-war occupation duty.

After World War I
After the war, Sturgis commanded the demobilization centers at Camp Gordon, Camp Pike, and Camp Sherman between 1919 and 1921. In June 1920 he returned to his permanent rank of brigadier general. In October 1921, Sturgis was promoted to permanent major general. He commanded the Panama Canal Department until October 1924. Sturgis commanded the Third Corps Area headquartered at Fort Holabird from November 1924 until retiring in August 1925.

Retirement and death
In retirement, Sturgis resided in Washington, D.C. He died there on March 7, 1933. He is buried at Arlington National Cemetery, in Arlington, Virginia, with his wife Bertha.

Personal life
In 1896, Sturgis married Bertha Bement (1875–1955). They were the parents of Major General Samuel D. Sturgis III, Elizabeth T. Sturgis, and Robert Bement Sturgis.

References

External links

|-

1861 births
1933 deaths
American military personnel of the Philippine–American War
American military personnel of the Spanish–American War
Burials at Arlington National Cemetery
Major generals
United States Military Academy alumni
United States Army generals of World War I
United States Army generals
Military personnel from Missouri
United States Army Field Artillery Branch personnel